NGC 520 is a pair of colliding spiral galaxies about 105 million light-years away in the constellation Pisces. They were discovered by astronomer William Herschel on 13 December 1784.

Halton Arp called this the second-brightest very disturbed galaxy in the sky, and it is as bright in the infrared and radio bands as the Antennae Galaxies. Simulations indicate this object consists of two galactic disks that began interacting about 300 million years ago. The system is still in an early stage of its merger, showing two separate velocity systems in the spectra, and two small tails. Two galactic nuclei have been detected, and one is an H II nucleus.

The main galactic component is being viewed edge-on, making it fainter in the optical band. The secondary component is brighter but less massive than the main, and is located to the northwest. They are separated by a dark lane of dust. The region of the galaxies outside their nuclei experienced a period of increased star formation roughly around the time they began to interact. Two dwarf objects are located in the vicinity of this merging pair, and one of them, designated UGC957, is located in the northern tidal tail – it may be the result of the interaction.

When viewed in the X-ray band, the interacting galaxies appear around half as luminous as expected given their merger state. Analysis of the gas and molecular features suggests the secondary merger component is gas poor. Most of the star formation, therefore, took place in the gas-rich main component to the southeast. 15 X-ray sources are detected within the merger, with many of them displaying long-term variability. A large galactic wind is evident, being driven by the starburst activity.

References

External links

 NGC 520, An Interacting pair of Spiral Galaxies
 

Interacting galaxies
Pisces (constellation)
0520
00966
05193
157
17841213
Discoveries by William Herschel